George H. Newhall (October 24, 1850 – November 4, 1923) was a Massachusetts politician who served in the Massachusetts House of Representatives, as a member of the Board of Aldermen and a member and President of the Common Council of Lynn, Massachusetts and as the 35th Mayor of Lynn.

Biography
Newhall was born in Lynn, Massachusetts on October 24, 1850.  He attended Wilbraham Wesleyan Academy in Wilbraham, Massachusetts.

He died at his home in Lynn on November 4, 1923.

Business career
Newhall was involved in the manufacture of shoes.  He later became involved in the real estate and insurance business.  He was also the President of the Lynn City Street Railway Company.

Political career

Newhall was a member of the Lynn Common Council from 1886 to 1887, he was the President of the Common Council in 1887.  From  1889 to 1890 and again from 1904 to 1905 he was a member of the Lynn Board of Aldermen.

From 1913 to 1917 Newhall was the Mayor of Lynn, Massachusetts.

See also
 1919 Massachusetts legislature
 1921–1922 Massachusetts legislature

Notes

1850 births
1923 deaths
Massachusetts city council members
Republican Party members of the Massachusetts House of Representatives
Mayors of Lynn, Massachusetts